Our Lady of Sorrows, Queen of Poland, Our Lady of Licheń, or Virgin of Licheń is a Roman Catholic icon of the Blessed Virgin Mary venerated by its Polish faithful. It dates to 1772 and is permanently enshrined within the Sanctuary of Our Lady of Licheń, in central Poland, which was built to honor it, and receives about 1.5 million pilgrims per year.

Along with the Black Madonna of Częstochowa, located in Częstochowa, southern Poland, the image is one of the two most venerated Marian images in Poland. The image was canonically crowned by Pope Paul VI on 15 August 1967.

Description
In the central image, the Virgin Mary has a gold dress, is being crowned by two angels and is surrounded by a ring of stars. Below the image, a ribbon carries the inscription: "Queen of Poland, give us days of peace." The image measures 9.5 × 15.5 cm and is on larger panel of 16 × 25 cm. There is a second crown above the image, on the larger panel.

Legend and history

The icon was painted in 1772 as a replica of the icon of the Blessed Virgin Mary enshrined in Rokitno, Międzyrzecz County in Western Poland. According to legend, a Polish soldier (called Thomas Kłossowski) was wounded in the Battle of Leipzig in 1813 and had a vision of the Virgin Mary who saved him from death and instructed him to look for the image upon his return to Poland. Kłossowski is then said to have looked for and found the image in the woods in Grąblin as instructed.

According to oral tradition, in 1850 Kłossowski and shepherd Nicholas Sikatka witnessed several apparitions of the Virgin Mary who called for repentance and prayer. In the apparitions, the Virgin reportedly predicted war and a cholera epidemic but also gave hope. During the cholera plague of 1852, the image became famous for performing miracles.

On 29 September 1852, the image was moved to the parish church in Licheń and remained there until 2006.  Cardinal Stefan Wyszynski, the Primate of the Millennium gave its Canonical Coronation towards the image with the approval of Pope Paul VI on 15 August 1967.

The basilica
In 1994 the construction of the new basilica of Sanctuary of Our Lady of Lichen was started to house the image and accommodate a large number of pilgrims. Pope John Paul II blessed the basilica in 1999. The basilica is Poland's largest church, the seventh-largest in Europe and eleventh in the world. 

The basilica's organ created by Professor Andrzej Chorosiński and manufactured by the Zych company (157 stops, 6 manuals and pedalboard) is the largest instrument in Poland, the fourth largest in Europe and thirteenth-largest in the world. On 2 July  2006, the image was placed in the main altar of the basilica.

See also
 Marian devotions
 Roman Catholic Mariology

References

1772 paintings
Paintings of the Virgin Mary
Catholic Church in Poland
Marian devotions
The Most Holy Virgin Mary, Queen of Poland
National symbols of Poland
Angels in art
Our Lady of Sorrows